Joseph D. Andrade is an American bioengineer, professor, educator, scientist and writer. He is Distinguished Professor Emeritus in the Departments of Bioengineering, Materials Science and Engineering, and Pharmaceutics at University of Utah.

Andrade's research has been focused on biomaterials and on biochemical sensors. He has supervised some 50 graduate students, written seven books, produced 125 scientific papers and holds six patents.

Andrade became a Fellow of the American Institute for Medical and Biological Engineering in 1991 and was awarded an honorary doctorate from Uppsala University in 2000.

Education 
Andrade entered the University of California-Berkeley in Fall, 1959, where he studied for more than two years and then dropped out. Two years later he was awarded the B.S. in Materials Science from San Jose State University, in 1965. He then attended the University of Denver, completing his Ph.D. in Metallurgy and Materials Science in January, 1969.

Career 
Andrade joined the University of Utah as an Assistant Professor in 1969. He rose through the ranks to become a Distinguished Professor in 2001. In 1983, he was appointed Dean of College of Engineering and served until 1987. He served as Chairman of the Department of Bioengineering from 1988 to 1991, Interim Chair of the Department of Pharmaceutics from 1998 to 1999 and the Co-Chair of the Department of Bioengineering from 1998 to 2000.

From 1977 to 1979, Andrade was the Editor-in-Chief of the Journal of Bioengineering. He served as the Vice President for Public Policy at the American Institute of Medical and Biological Engineering from 1992 to 1994 and was the program chair of the 1993 meeting, which resulted in the book, Medical and Biological Engineering in the Future of Health Care.

Andrade's public service and community activities include enhancing elementary school science education and informal science education. He developed the University of Utah's first video-intensive general science telecourse, Science without Walls: Science in Your World, which was broadcast throughout most of Utah on KUEN for some 20 years, ending in 2012. He contributed significantly to the genesis and establishment of The Leonardo - Salt Lake City's Science, Art, Technology Center, which opened in 2011. He continues to serve as a science advisor and on its board of directors.

In 2012, Andrade retired as emeritus and distinguished professor, University of Utah. The same year, he ran as an unaffiliated candidate for Congress in Utah's District 2 on a Towards a Sustainable Future campaign.

Research and work 
Andrade's research has been focused on biomaterials and on biochemical sensors. He is most known for formulating the minimum interfacial free energy hypothesis for biocompatibility. His early work dealt with blood-materials interactions and with approaches for enhanced blood compatibility, based largely on protein-coated, hydrogel-coated, and/or polyethylene glycol-coated surfaces.

His PhD dissertation was a theoretical model of protein adsorption. Later, the theory work was expanded to include polyethylene-glycol and similar interfaces. The focus on surfaces and interfaces required analysis of and development of tools for the characterization of polymer-based interfaces, including interface electric potentials, interfacial energy, chemical composition (via X-ray Photoelectron Spectroscopy), and interface fluorescence analysis.

The second stage of his research career focused on biochemical sensors, based initially on fiber optics and total internal reflection fluorescence (TIRF) analysis. The biochemical sensor work used firefly luciferase bioluminescence and enzyme biochemistry for substrate specificity.

He developed the University of Utah's first video-intensive general science telecourse - Science without Walls: Science in Your World - beginning in 1989. The 40 segment TV course was broadcast on KUEN TV throughout Utah for 20 years, until 2012.

In the late 2010s, he began working to make clear and obvious the underlying assumptions that form the basis of the current economic system. This was the basis of his 2012 run for US Congress in Utah's Second Congressional District. He lost. He is now focused on planetary sustainability for the 21st Century. He uses online resources to distribute ideas, memes and semi-fictional writings. In April 2016, he published State Change: A Chemical Fantasy, a semi-novel in which 29 real right wing ideologs are given MDMA illegally and secretly in order to improve their objectivity, rationality, and empathy.

Awards and honors 
1978 - Ebert Prize, Academy of Pharmaceutical Sciences
1981 - Distinguished Research Award, University of Utah
1985 - Clemson Award for Contributions to Literature, Biomaterials Society and Clemson University
1987 - Patent Prize, College of Engineering, University of Utah
1991 - Polymer Science Pioneers, Polymer News
1991 - Fellow, American Institute of Medical and Biological Engineering
1992 - Governor's Medal for Science and Technology
1992 - Distinguished University Service Award in Biological Sciences, Utah Academy of Sciences, Arts, and Letters
1993 - Faculty Service Award, College of Engineering, University of Utah
1995 - Honorary Member, Materials Research Society of India
1995 - Surface in Biomaterials Fdn Award for Excellence in Surface Science
2000 - Honorary PhD Degree, Uppsala University, Sweden
2011 - Prolific Inventor, University of Utah

Publications

Books 
Hydrogels for Medical and Related Applications (1976)
Surface and Interfacial Aspects of Biomedical Polymers Vol. 1 - Surface Chemistry and Physics (1985)
Surface and Interfacial Aspects of Biomedical Polymers Vol. 2 - Protein Adsorption (1985)
Artificial Organs: The W J Kolff Festschrift (1987)
Dynamic Aspects of Polymer Surfaces (1988)
Medical and Biological Engineering in the Future of Health Care (1994)
Science without Walls: Science in YOUR World (1998)
State Change: A Chemical Fantasy (2016)

References 

University of Denver alumni
San Jose State University alumni
University of Utah faculty
1941 births
Living people
American bioengineers